Mindy is an English feminine given name, originally a diminutive of Melinda.

Notable people with the name include:

People
Mindy Aloff, American editor, journalist, essayist, and dance critic
Mindy Baha El Din (1958-2013), American-born Egyptian ornithologist, eco-activist, and environmentalist
Mindy Budgor, American businesswoman and writer
Mindy Cohn (born 1966), American actress known for her role on the television show The Facts of Life
Mindy Duncan (born c. 1971), winner of the 1988 Miss Teen USA pageant
Mindy Finn, American political and technology consultant, entrepreneur, and former Vice-Presidential candidate.
Mindy Gehrs, All-American swimmer
Mindy Gledhill, singer-songwriter from Eureka, California
Mindy Greiling (born 1948), American politician, member of the Minnesota House of Representatives
Mindy Grossman, American chief executive officer of the Home Shopping Network
Mindy Hall, American makeup artist
Mindy Jacobsen, American, first blind woman to be ordained as a hazzan (also called a cantor) in the history of Judaism
Mindy Kaling (born 1979), American actress and comedian, producer of the television show The Office and star of TV show The Mindy Project
Mindy Kleinberg, American activist and member of the Jersey Girls
Mindy L. Klasky, American fantasy novelist
Mindy Marin, American casting director, producer, and writer
Mindy McCready (1975-2013), American country music singer
Mindy Newell (born 1953), American comic book author
Mindy Robinson, American actress, model, and reality star
Mindy Rosenfeld, American flutist, piper, and harpist
Mindy Smith (born 1972), American singer and songwriter
Mindy Sterling (born 1953), American actress best known for playing Frau Farbissina in the Austin Powers movies
Mindy White, American musician

Fictional characters
Mindy, half of the duo of Buttons and Mindy from Animaniacs
Mindy, from The Grim Adventures of Billy & Mandy
Mindy, a mermaid from The SpongeBob SquarePants Movie
Mindy St Claire, the sole resident of the medium place in the TV show The Good Place
Mindy Crenshaw, from the television show Drake & Josh
Mindy Gladstone, Joey Gladstone's mom in Full House
Mindy Kuhel Lahiri, main character from the TV show The Mindy Project
Mindy McConnell, one of the title characters from the television show Mork & Mindy, portrayed by Pam Dawber
Mindy McCready (Hit-Girl), from the Kick-Ass comic book series 
Mindy Minus, the antagonist from the TV show 100 Things to Do Before High School
Mindy O'Dell, from the television show Veronica Mars
Kid Mindy, from the Midnighter comic book series
Mindy, from Pokémon Diamond and Pearl and Pokémon Platinum

See also
Tropical Storm Mindy, various storms named Mindy
Mindi (disambiguation)
Minde (disambiguation)

English feminine given names
English given names
Feminine given names